Bitwa na głosy (English: Clash of the Choirs) is a Polish light entertainment reality television series broadcast by TVP2. Choir members were selected in open auditions held in each city with the celebrity officiating.

Cast

Presenters

Judges

Seasons

Season 1

Teams

Episodes

Week 1

Running order

Week 2
Group Performance: Rihanna - "Don't Stop The Music"
Top 4 Teams Performance:

Week 3
Group Performance:
Top 8 Teams Performance:

Week 4
Group Performance: U2
Top 7 Teams Performance:

Week 5
Group Performance: Beyoncé - "Crazy in Love"
Top 6 Teams Performance:

Week 6
Group Performance: Robbie Williams - "Let Me Entertain You"
Top 5 Teams Performance:

Week 7
Group Performance: Republika - "Biała Flaga"
Top 4 Teams Performance:

Week 8
Group Performance:
Top 3 Teams Performance:

Week 9
Group Performance: Reel 2 Real - "I Like to Move It", Andrea Bocelli - "Time to Say Goodbye"
Top 3 Teams Performance:

Week 10
Group Performance: Gloria Gaynor - "I Will Survive", Bon Jovi - "It's My Life"
Top 2 Teams Performance:

Top 8 Teams Performance:

Weekly results
The order is based on viewer votes.

Season 2

Teams

Episodes

Week 1
 Musical Performance: Piotr Kupicha & TOP 4 Teams - "Pokaż na co Cię stać"
Top 4 Teams Performance:

Week 2
Group Performance: Gloria Estefan - "Conga"
Top 4 Teams Performance:

Week 3
Group Performance: Carmina Burana - "O Fortuna"
Top 8 Teams Performance:

Week 4
Group Performance: Duffy - "Mercy"
Top 7 Teams Performance:

Week 5
 Group Performance: Piotr Rubik - "Niech mówią, że to nie jest miłość"
 Top 6 Teams Performance:

Week 6
Group Performance: Tadeusz Woźniak - "Zegarmistrz światła", Michel Teló - "Ai Se Eu Te Pego"
Top 5 Teams Performance:

Week 7
Group Performance: The Black Eyed Peas - "Let's Get It Started"
Top 4 Teams Performance:

Week 8
Group Performance: Oddział Zamknięty - "Party"
Top 3 Teams Performance:

Week 9
Group Performance: Kool and The Gang - "Celebration"
Top 3 Teams Mix: Mezo - "Sacrum", Ryszard Rynkowski - "Dziewczyny lubią brąz", Kamil Bednarek - "Raz, dwa, w górę ręcę"
Top 3 Teams Performance:

Week 10
Group Performance (TOP 8): Bon Jovi - "It's My life", Michael Jackson - "Will You Be There"
Top 2 Teams Performance:

Top 8 Teams Performance:

Weekly results
The order is based on viewer votes.

Season 3

Teams

Episodes

Week 1
Group Performance: Irene Cara – "What A Feeling"
Top 4 Teams Performance:

Week 2
Group Performance: Mickey & Sylvia - "Love is strange", Pitbull - "Back in Time"
Top 4 Teams Performance:

Week 3
Group Performance: Bon Jovi - "It's My Life"
Top 8 Teams Performance:

Week 4
Group Performance: Czesław Niemen - "Dziwny jest ten świat"
Top 7 Teams Performance:

Week 5
Group Performance: Blues Brothers – "Everybody Needs Somebody to Love" 
Celebrity Performance: Loka – "Prawdziwe powietrze"'
Top 6 Teams Performance:

Week 6
Group Performance: Dżem - "Naiwne pytania"
Group Performance (Women): Cyndi Lauper – "Girls Just Want To Have Fun"
Group Performance (Men): T.Love - "Chłopaki nie płaczą"
Top 5 Teams Performance:

Week 7
Group Performance: Survivor – "Eye of the Tiger"
Top 4 Teams Performance:

Week 8
Group Performance: Bonnie Tyler – "I Need a Hero"
Top 3 Teams Performance:

Week 9
Group Performance: Van Halen - "Jump"
Celebity Performance: Alicja Węgorzewska, Wojciech Jagielski, Katarzyna Zielińska, Tomasz Pukacki -  "Phantom Of The Opera"
Top 3 Teams Performance:

Week 10
Group Performance:  Pink Floyd – "Another Brick In The Wall"
Top 2 Teams Performance:

Top 8 Teams Performance:

Weekly results
The order is based on viewer votes.

See also
Clash of the Choirs

Polish reality television series
Polish music television series
Singing talent shows
2011 Polish television series debuts
Telewizja Polska original programming